Ruan Jacobus Combrinck (born 10 May 1990) is a South African rugby union player. He plays mostly as a wing.

School career
Combrinck attended Michaelhouse in The Natal Midlands and played in the same first team as Springboks fly-half Patrick Lambie and scrum-half Ross Cronje

International rugby
On 28 May 2016, Combrinck was included in a 31-man  squad for their three-test match series against a touring  team.

He made his debut as replacement for the Springboks on 18 June 2016 vs. Ireland at Emirates Park in Johannesburg. He scored a try on debut and was also Man of the Match.

Honours
 Super Rugby runner up (3) 2016, 2017, 2018
 Currie Cup winner 2021

References

External links 

itsrugby.co.uk profile

1990 births
Living people
People from Vryheid
Afrikaner people
South African rugby union players
Golden Lions players
Western Province (rugby union) players
Lions (United Rugby Championship) players
Rugby union fullbacks
Stellenbosch University alumni
South Africa international rugby union players
Hanazono Kintetsu Liners players
Stade Français players
Blue Bulls players
Bulls (rugby union) players
Alumni of Michaelhouse
Rugby union players from KwaZulu-Natal